Gazeta SOT is a daily newspaper published in Albania.

Reporters Without Borders describes Gazeta Sot as a daily newspaper established in 2002.

References

2002 establishments in Albania
Albanian-language newspapers
Mass media in Tirana
Newspapers published in Albania
Publications established in 2002